Michael Gregor, born Mikheil Grigorashvili or Mikhail Leontyevich Grigorashvili (1888–1953) was an aircraft engineer of Georgian origin, one of the pioneering aviators in the Russian Empire, the United States, and Canada.

Early years
Born in Derbent, Russia, Grigorashvili graduated from the Imperial Institute of Communications in St. Petersburg and was trained as a pilot in France in 1911.

Russia
Upon his return to Russia, Grigorashvili worked as an instructor for pilots and joined the army as an officer in World War I.

Georgia

The Bolshevik coup in 1917 forced him to retire to a newly independent Georgia where he worked as a road engineer in the Georgian ministry for communications.

United States
After the Soviet takeover of Georgia in 1921, he went in exile to the United States where he would naturalize in 1926. Having briefly worked for a minor aviation factory in Rhode Island, Grigorashvili, by then known as Gregor, was recruited as an aircraft designer by the Dayton-Wright Company in 1921, Curtiss-Wright in 1923, Seversky Aircraft Company in 1932 and Chase Aircraft in the 1940s where he worked until 1953. In 1934, Gregor founded his own firm Gregor Aircraft which constructed an original light plane GR-1.

Canada
Two years later, Gregor was employed by the Canadian Car and Foundry and designed FDB-1 biplane fighter. Despite being an advanced and innovative design, incorporating all-metal construction with flush riveting, retractable undercarriage and a sleek shape, the FDB-I was overtaken by events and, after being unable to find a buyer, was lost in a fire in 1945. Despite that, Gregor became one of the founders of the Canadian aviation industry.

Final years
In the 1940s, Gregor worked as one of the leading designers for the Chase Aircraft company. He died in Trenton, New Jersey.

References

Notes

Bibliography

 Burkowski, Gordon and Gerry Beauchamp. "Twin Wings and not even a Prayer." Wings, Vol. 27, no. 10, June 1997.
 Milberry, Larry. Aviation in Canada. Toronto: McGraw-Hill Ryerson Limited, 1979. .
 Molson, Ken M. and Harold A. Taylor.  Canadian Aircraft Since 1909. Stittsville, Ontario: Canada's Wings, Inc., 1982. .
 Smith, Fred. "One to Remember: Flying the Gregor FDB-1." Air Classics, Vol. 17, no. 5, May 1981.

1888 births
1953 deaths
American people of Georgian (country) descent
Aircraft designers from Georgia (country)
American aerospace engineers
Russian aviators
People from Derbent
Members of the Early Birds of Aviation
People of World War I from Georgia (country)